Gustavo Quintana (born 20 May 1954) is a Colombian weightlifter. He competed in the men's flyweight event at the 1976 Summer Olympics.

References

External links
 

1954 births
Living people
Colombian male weightlifters
Olympic weightlifters of Colombia
Weightlifters at the 1976 Summer Olympics
Place of birth missing (living people)
20th-century Colombian people
21st-century Colombian people